The Meisner Bank Building is a historic two-story building in Shelton, Nebraska. It was built in 1908-1910 for the Meisner Bank founded by George Meisner in 1894. The building designed in the Renaissance Revival style. It has been listed on the National Register of Historic Places since March 25, 1999.

References

National Register of Historic Places in Buffalo County, Nebraska
Renaissance Revival architecture in Nebraska
Commercial buildings completed in 1910
1910 establishments in Nebraska